Betzenberg is a hill and quarter of the German city of Kaiserslautern, Rhineland-Palatinate.

Betzenberg may also refer to:

 a colloquial name for the Fritz Walter Stadium in Kaiserslautern
 Betzenberg (Schönbuch), a mountain in Baden-Württemberg, Germany

See also
 Pitzenberg